Dipsas peruana, the Peruvian snail-eater or Peru snail-eater,  is a non-venomous snake found in Peru, Venezuela, and Colombia, Ecuador, and Bolivia.

References

Dipsas
Snakes of South America
Reptiles of Peru
Reptiles of Colombia
Reptiles of Venezuela
Reptiles of Ecuador
Reptiles of Bolivia
Reptiles described in 1898
Taxa named by Oskar Boettger